Barnali is a Village and Union Council (UC) of Gujrat District, in the Punjab province of Pakistan. It is part of Kharian Tehsil and is located at 32°43'0N 73°50'0E with an altitude of 239 metres (786 feet).
 
Barnali is a beautiful village with classical landscape of northern Punjab. It has barren land and agricultural totally depends upon rain. A Union Council consist of four villages with population of almost 30000 to 35000. Its rich educational history can be traced back to 1951 when the oldest Boys School was established.
Prominent Figures
1. Master Allah Ditta. He laid the foundation stone for education by establishing the first boys middle school in early fifties. Under his auspices educational stream flourished in Barnali. He died in February 2016.
2. Hafiz Muhammad Din. He was a prominent religious figure, who taught the Quran to almost whole village.

References 

Populated places in Gujrat District
Union councils of Gujrat District